M. Ramalingam (b. 1939), is a Tamil, literary critic, and translator from Tamil Nadu, India.

Biography
Ramalingam was born in Thiruthuraipoondi, Thanjavur District. He joined the Tamil Nadu Educational Service in 1964 and later became 
Professor and Head of the Tamil department at Government Arts College, Kumbakonam. He has written seven volumes of literary criticism. In 1981, he was awarded the Sahitya Akademi Award for Tamil for his critical work on modern Tamil prose Pudhiya Urai Nadai (lit. The New Prose).

References

1939 births
Living people
20th-century Indian translators
Recipients of the Sahitya Akademi Award in Tamil
Tamil writers
People from Tiruvarur district
Indian Tamil people
Indian literary critics
Scholars from Tamil Nadu